Tamara Salaški (born 16 October 1988) is a Serbian sprinter. She competed in the 400 metres at the 2016 European Athletics Championships. She competed for Serbia at the 2016 Rio Olympics with a 52.70 result. She ran third for the qualification. Her personal best is 51.89.

References

External links
 
  (archive)

1988 births
Living people
Serbian female sprinters
Place of birth missing (living people)
Athletes (track and field) at the 2016 Summer Olympics
Olympic athletes of Serbia
Olympic female sprinters
21st-century Serbian women